The FTBOA Florida Sire Stakes My Dear Girl division is a Thoroughbred horse race run annually at Gulfstream Park, in Hallandale Beach, Florida for two-year-old fillies by FTBOA registered stallions at a distance of a mile and a sixteenth on dirt. It is part of the eleven-race Florida Thoroughbred Breeders' & Owners' Association (FTBOA) Florida Sire series of which seven races are hosted by Gulfstream Park and four by Tampa Bay Downs.

History
Inaugurated at Calder Race Course in 1982, the race was part of Calder's Florida Stallion Stakes series through 2013 after which Calder's racing operations were leased to the Stronach Group, operators of Gulfstream Park.

Named in honor of My Dear Girl, the 1959 American Champion Two-Year-Old Filly filly, it is the final and longest of the three Gulfstream Park FBTOA races exclusively for this specific age and gender group of registered Florida-breds who are from a Florida Sire Stakes eligible stallion. Run between the beginning of August and the end of September, the My Dear Girl Stakes follows the Desert Vixen Stakes at 6 furlongs and the Susan's Girl Stakes at 7 furlongs.

Records
Speed record at Gulfstream Park:
 At 1 1/16 miles : 1:44.41 by Two Sixty in 2019

Speed record at Calder:
 At 1 1/16 miles : 1:45.92 by Ivanavinalot in 2002

Most wins by a jockey:
 3 – José A. Vélez Jr. (1985, 1989, 1991)
 3 – Manoel Cruz (2002, 2006, 2007)

Most wins by a trainer:
 3 – James E. Bracken (1983, 1985, 1993)
 3 – Edward Plesa Jr. (1998, 1999, 2006)

Most wins by an owner:
 2 – Ione & H. J. Elkins (1994, 2007)
 2 – John A. Franks (2001, 2003)
 2 – Gilbert G. Campbell (2002, 2013)

Winners
Gulfstream Park 2018–2019 Media Guide and race history:

References

Restricted stakes races in the United States
Gulfstream Park
Calder Race Course
Horse races in Florida
Flat horse races for two-year-old fillies
Recurring sporting events established in 1982
1982 establishments in Florida